Karen Gerbrands (born 29 August 1967) is a Dutch politician and former nurse. Representing the Party for Freedom, she has been a member of municipal council of The Hague since 27 March 2014 and was a member of the House of Representatives between 23 March 2017 and 12 December 2018.

Early life and career 
Karen Gerbrands was born on 29 August 1967 in The Hague.

She worked as a nurse in hospitals, home care, prison, and nursing homes.

Politics 
Gerbrands was a political aid for the Party for Freedom in the House of Representatives from 2009 to June 2010.

Representing the Party for Freedom, she was a member of the municipal council of The Hague from 11 March 2010 to 17 June 2010 and a member of the House of Representatives from 17 June 2010 to 19 September 2012, where she focused on matters of health care policy and food safety.

She has been a member of municipal council of The Hague again since 27 March 2014. She temporarily was a member of the House of Representatives from 13 January 2015 to 5 May 2015, when she replaced Fleur Agema who was on pregnancy leave. She has been a member of the House of Representatives again since 23 March 2017.

Personal life 
Gerbrands lives in The Hague.

References 

1967 births
21st-century Dutch politicians
21st-century Dutch women politicians
Dutch nurses
Living people
Members of the House of Representatives (Netherlands)
Municipal councillors of The Hague
Party for Freedom politicians
People in health professions from The Hague